Arjun Gupta may refer to:

 Arjun Gupta (actor) (born 1986), American actor and producer
 Arjun Kumar Gupta, professor of statistics